Untethered Moon is the eighth studio album by American rock band Built to Spill. The album was released on vinyl for Record Store Day on April 18, 2015 and on CD and digital format on April 21, 2015. It is the band’s first album in nearly six years, since 2009’s There Is No Enemy, making it the band’s longest delay between studio albums up to that point. Frontman Doug Martsch explained: 
It is the first album to feature Steve Gere (drums) and Jason Albertini (bass), replacing Scott Plouf and Brett Nelson respectively, who both left the group in 2012.

The album was announced on February 5, 2015 along with a tour schedule beginning in March. The track "Living Zoo" was released via SoundCloud on February 24, 2015. The official music video for “Living Zoo” premiered on Noisey on March 25, 2015.

Critical reception

The album has received praise, with critics and fans alike noting a revived energy within the band as well as Doug Marstch's consistently impressive guitar work. At Metacritic, which assigns a weighted average rating out of 100 to reviews from mainstream critics, Untethered Moon has received an average score of 76, based on 18 reviews, indicating "generally favorable reviews". Cam Lindsay of Exclaim! wrote that Untethered Moon is "arguably the most enjoyable Built to Spill album since 1999's pivotal Keep It Like A Secret," citing "a directness to these songs that has been missing for a few albums."

Track listing
All music written by Built to Spill and all lyrics by Built to Spill with Karena Youtz

References

2015 albums
Built to Spill albums
Warner Records albums